Stephen Forbes may refer to:
Stephen Alfred Forbes (1844–1930), American zoologist and ecologist
Steve Forbes (boxer) (born 1977), American boxer
Steve Forbes (basketball) (born 1965), American college basketball head coach
Steve Forbes (born 1947), American businessman and politician
Steve Forbes (footballer) (born 1975), English association footballer